This is a list of Italian Academy Award winners and nominees. This list details the performances of Italian filmmakers, actors, and films that have either been nominated or have won an Academy Award.

Best Actor in a Leading Role
This list focuses on Italian-born actors.

Best Actor in a Supporting Role
This list focuses on Italian-born or with Italian citizenship actors.

Best Actress in a Leading Role
This list focuses on Italian-born actresses.

Best Actress in a Supporting Role
This list focuses on Italian-born actresses.

Best Animated Feature
This list focuses on Italian-born directors.

Best Production Design
This list focuses on Italian-born art directors.

Best Cinematography
This list focuses on Italian-born cinematographers.

Best Costume Design
This list focuses on Italian-born costume designers.

Best Director
This list focuses on Italian-born directors.

Best Documentary Feature
This list focuses on Italian-born producers/directors.

Best Documentary Feature (Short Subject)
This list focuses on Italian-born producers/directors.

Best Editing
This list focuses on Italian-born editors.

Best Picture
This list focuses on Italian-born producers.

Best International Feature Film

In this category, Italian films have 28 nominations, 11 wins, and 3 honorary awards. They have the most wins and the second most nominations after France.

Best Makeup and Hairstyling

Best Music (Original Score)
This list focuses on scores by Italian-born composers.

Best Music (Original Song)
This list focuses on songs by Italian-born composers and/or lyricists.

Best Short Film – Animated
This list focuses on Italian-born directors.

Best Short Film – Live Action
This list focuses on Italian-born directors.

Best Visual Effects

Best Writing – Adapted Screenplay
This list focuses on Italian-born screenplay writers.

Best Writing – Original Screenplay
This list focuses on Italian-born screenplay writers.

Best Writing – Story 
This list focuses on Italian-born screenplay writers

Special awards
This list focuses on Italian-born honorees

Nominations and Winners

Academy Awards
Lists of Academy Award winners and nominees by nationality or region